San Tomé may refer to:

 Rotonda di San Tomè, a church in northern Italy
 San Tomé, Venezuela, a town in Anzoátegui, Venezuela
 San Tomé de Angostura, one of the original names of the city Ciudad Bolivar, Venezuela
 São Tomé and Príncipe, an island nation in the Gulf of Guinea
 São Tomé Island, one of two islands and provinces in nation of São Tomé and Príncipe
 São Tomé, the capital city of the island and province of São Tomé